Nikoletina Bursać is a 1964 Yugoslavian film directed by Branko Bauer. It is based on a famous novel by the Bosnian Serb writer Branko Ćopić. Both the novel and the film describe the adventures of a Yugoslav Partisan machine-gunner Nikola "Nikoletina" Bursać, a tough man with a noble and gentle heart.

References

External links
 

1964 films
Croatian war comedy films
1960s Croatian-language films
Films set in Yugoslavia
Films directed by Branko Bauer
Jadran Film films
Yugoslav World War II films
Films based on Serbian novels
Yugoslav black-and-white films
War films set in Partisan Yugoslavia
Fictional Yugoslav Partisans
Characters in Serbian novels
Yugoslav war comedy films